The 1990 season was the Minnesota Vikings' 30th in the National Football League. Under head coach Jerry Burns, they finished with a 6–10 record and missed the playoffs for the first time since 1986. The Vikings went 1–6 through their first seven games, including a five-game losing streak. They then won their next five (including a 41–13 win over the eventual NFC Central champion Chicago Bears in Week 12) to get back to 6–6 and give themselves a shot at a wild card spot in the playoffs; however, the Vikings lost their final four games to finish at 6–10. While their overall record was tied with three other teams in the division, the Vikings' 4–8 record against fellow NFC teams meant they finished bottom of the NFC Central. It was the first time since 1984 Minnesota finished last in the division, and the second since 1968. 

Notable additions to the team this season were wide receiver Cris Carter and undrafted defensive lineman John Randle, both of whom went on to have Hall of Fame careers.

Injuries to the defense and a lackluster season from Herschel Walker were the story of the team's season.

Offseason

1990 Draft

 These picks were involved in the Herschel Walker trade on October 12, 1989.
 During the 1989 Draft, the Raiders traded their 12th-round selection (335th overall) to Minnesota for their 11th-round selection in the 1990 draft.

Undrafted free agents

Staff

Roster

Preseason

Regular season

Schedule

Standings

Statistics

Team leaders

League rankings

Awards and honors
Randall McDaniel, NFC Pro Bowl selection
Randall McDaniel, All-Pro selection by Associated Press
Randall McDaniel, All-NFC selection by UPI

References

Minnesota Vikings seasons
Minnesota
Minnesota